Byambasuren Davaa, also known as Davaagiin Byambasüren (born 1971 in Ulaanbaatar), is a Mongolian filmmaker currently residing in Germany.

Between 1995 and 1998 she studied at the Movie Academy in Ulaanbaatar. In 1998 she began to work as a moderator and director's assistant with Mongolian National Television. In 2000 she moved to Munich, Germany, to study documentary film and communication sciences at the University of Television and Film Munich.

In 2003 Davaa wrote and directed The Story of the Weeping Camel (2003), which gained several awards and nominations, including Best Documentary Film at the Bavarian Film Awards, Best Documentary at the 57th Directors Guild of America Awards, and a nomination for Best Documentary at the 77th Academy Awards. Her other films include The Cave of the Yellow Dog (2006), for which she won the 2006 German Film Award for Best Children's Film, and Veins of the World (2020).

Her films through 2006 tell stories embedded in the traditional life of the nomads in Mongolia. The subjects of her movies also serve as amateur actors, playing mostly themselves, which positions her work somewhere between documentary and fiction.

Early life
Davaa was born in Mongolia in 1971. She studied international law in Mongolia's capital Ulaanbaatar and then moved to Germany to study documentary film direction. Regarding the reason of her move to Germany, Davaa has stated: "I wanted to learn how to tell stories. Stories that move people of different cultures that are meaningful and universal. For me, the step out of Mongolia, out of my nomadic-family based culture, was also the yearning to learn to understand and relate to the larger context in the world."

She studied documentary filming at the University of Television and Film in Munich, Germany. Before moving to Munich, she worked as a television presenter and assistant director for a Mongolian television channel.

Career
In 2003 she wrote and directed The Story of the Weeping Camel, which won several awards, including the Bavarian Film Awards for Best Documentary, the Directors Guild of America Award for Best Documentary and the San Francisco International Film Festival International Film Critics Award. The film was also nominated for Best Documentary at the 77th Academy Awards. The movie was extremely well received and sold in more than 60 territories, grossing over 9 million dollars. The Story of the Weeping Camel was cited by Rotten Tomatoes as one of the 165 best films directed by women in the 21st century.

In 2005 she wrote and directed The Cave of the Yellow Dog, for which she was also acclaimed. It was Davaa's second feature. The film focuses on a family of nomads living in the Altai, northwestern Mongolia, and the impact a stray dog has on them. The "actors" in the film are a real family of nomads, and the movie has been described as a "quasi-documentary." As other movies by Davaa, it depicts everyday moments for the nomadic Mongolians, using real nomadic Mongolians as actors, and thus in the movie there is "a crunch of authenticity when Mother cuts a block of cheese, milks the goat or sits at her sewing machine to make a school outfit for Nansal; when the father skins a pair of sheep, hoists the skins onto his motorcycle and drives off to sell them in the nearest town." The Cave of the Yellow Dog won the Best Children's Film Award at the 2006 German Film Award.

In 2020 she wrote and directed the drama thriller film Veins of the World, which had its world premiere at the 70th Berlin International Film Festival on February 23, 2020. The movie tells about a 11-year-old Mongolian boy living the traditional life as nomad with his family in the Mongolian steppe, whose peaceful life is "threatened by the encroachment of international mining companies, digging for gold and devastating the natural habitat." The boy's father opposes the encroachers, and after his death the boy carries on the fight. The movie was picked by Mongolia as its official entry for the 93rd Academy Awards in the category Best International Feature Film. After directing documentaries The Story of the Weeping Camel, The Cave of the Yellow Dog and Two Horses of Genghis Khan, Veins of the World was Dava's feature film debut.

Filmography

Feature films

Awards

References 

1971 births
Living people
Mongolian artists
University of Television and Film Munich alumni
Mongolian film directors
Mongolian women film directors
Mongolian documentary filmmakers
Directors Guild of America Award winners
21st-century Mongolian artists
20th-century Mongolian artists
Women documentary filmmakers
People from Ulaanbaatar
Mongolian emigrants to Germany
Mongolian screenwriters